The 2003 MAC Championship Game was played on December 4, 2003 at Doyt Perry Stadium in Bowling Green, Ohio.  The game featured the winner of each division of the Mid-American Conference. The game featured the Miami RedHawks, of the East Division, and the Bowling Green Falcons, of the West Division. The RedHawks beat the Falcons 49–27.  Miami quarterback Ben Roethlisberger threw for a game-record 440 yards in the process.

To date, this is the last MAC Championship game to be hosted by one of the schools involved. Subsequent contests have been played at Ford Field in Detroit.

References

Championship Game
MAC Championship Game
Bowling Green Falcons football games
Miami RedHawks football games
December 2003 sports events in the United States
MAC Championship